Young Man is a 2022 Russian comedy film written and directed by Alexandr Fomin. It was theatrically released on June 9, 2022.

Plot 
As a child, Vanya Revzin studied day and night. His mother sincerely believed that he would succeed, but in the end he could not become anyone. He was fired from his job, his wife left him. He decided that only with the help of cunning something can be achieved and he begins to pretend to be an seventeen-year-old guy.

Cast

Production
Director Alexandr Fomin presented the film back in 2019 at the face-to-face defense of projects applying for state support from the Cinema Foundation.
The director of the films Hardcore Henry (2015 film) and Nobody (2021 film) carefully followed the production of the film and tried to support the young director, for whom the film Young Man became a feature-length debut. 

The filming process was led by Versus Pictures and ID Production with the participation of the Gorky Film Studios. The idea of the film came to director Alexandr Fomin two years ago, and he approached Ilya Naishuller with it. He agreed without hesitation. 

Filming began on May 31, 2021 and took place in the village of Petrovo-Dalneye, Moscow Oblast, and near Moscow.

References

External links 
 
2022 films
2020s Russian-language films
2022 comedy films
Russian comedy films
Films shot in Moscow Oblast
Gorky Film Studio films